Edward North may refer to:

 Edward North, 1st Baron North (1496–1564), English peer and politician
 Edward W. North (1778–1843), mayor of Charleston, South Carolina
 Edward North (Conservative politician) (1900-1942), British Conservative politician